Pungent Effulgent is the debut studio album by British psychedelic rock band Ozric Tentacles. Released in 1989 to wide acclaim, it followed the many cassette-only albums they released in the 1980s.

Track listing

Credits
Ed Wynne – guitar, synthesizer, production
Mervin Pepler – drums
Roly Wynne – bass
Joie Hinton – synthesizer, sampling
John Egan – flute, voice
Paul Hankin – percussion
Nick Van Gelder – drums on "The Domes of G'Bal"
Generator John – drums on "Wreltch"
Marcus C. Diess – percussion on "Agog in the Ether"

Notes
The album's first track, "Dissolution", is one of very few songs by Ozric Tentacles to make use of noticeable vocals.

The seventh track, "Kick Muck" is a reference to the dust in the fields at free festivals typical in the '80's. Popular with fans at such open air venues, its name refers to the dance style at front of stage. The song oscillates between periods of intense, high tempo guitar and slower electronic psychedelia, enabling the crowd to recover before the next bout of "kicking muck"

References

1989 albums
Ozric Tentacles albums